State Route 238, also known as SR 238, is an east–west state highway in central Arizona.

Route description

The road west of this point is actually a county route. This stretch of road is known as Maricopa Road (except for a brief portion signed as Smith Enke Road within the city of Maricopa) and serves as a direct route between the two towns as well as an access road for the Sonoran Desert National Monument. It was originally a dirt road from Gila Bend to Maricopa, it was upgraded to a state highway to serve a proposed hazardous waste management facility west of Mobile. The official State Highway map shows this road terminating at Maricopa at the junction with State Route 347. Since its upgrade to a paved highway, this road has become a common shortcut for residents of the southern part of the Phoenix Metropolitan Area travelling to Yuma and San Diego.

Some road maps show a continuation of the route eastbound; after briefly overlapping a short southbound stretch of State Route 347 (also, confusingly, known as Maricopa Road or the John Wayne Parkway), the highway beelines southeast to its eastern terminus at Casa Grande; this stretch of the highway is known as the Maricopa-Casa Grande Highway.  According to ADOT, this section of road is not currently commissioned .

Virtually the entire road follows the Union Pacific Railroad's Sunset Route, with brief detours at the Maricopa and Casa Grande townsites.

Junction list
The highway begins on Maricopa Road, MP 24.

References

External links

SR 238 at Arizona Roads

238
Transportation in Maricopa County, Arizona
Transportation in Pinal County, Arizona